Olga Frycz (born 10 June 1986) is a Polish film and television actress. She has appeared in such films as All That I Love, Weiser and Edges of the Lord  as well as the television series M jak miłość and Cisza nad rozlewiskiem.

Frycz was born in Kraków and is the daughter of actor Jan Frycz, and sister of actor Gabriela Frycz.

External links
 

1986 births
Living people
Polish television actresses
Actresses from Kraków